Choe Yong-rim (born 20 November 1930) is a North Korean politician who served as the Premier of North Korea from June 2010 to April 2013 and was a member of the 6th Presidium of the Workers' Party of Korea. He has been described by The New York Times as a "KWP insider" and a "friend of Kim Jong-Il's family." He is honorary vice-president of the Presidium of the Supreme People's Assembly, the country's parliament.

Career
Choe Yong-rim joined the Korean People's Army in July 1950. He attended Mangyongdae Revolutionary School, Kim Il-sung University, and Moscow University. Qualifying as an electrical engineer, he has held various offices since the 1950s, including: instructor, section chief, vice-department director, first vice-department director and department director of the Central Committee of the Workers' Party of Korea and chief secretary of the Secretaries Office of the Kumsusan Assembly Hall. He has also held posts of vice-premier of the Administration Council, director of the Central Public Prosecutors Office and secretary general of the SPA Presidium.

From 11 April 2005 to July 2009, he was secretary general (sŏgijang) of the Presidium of the Supreme People's Assembly, succeeding Kim Yunhyŏk. Choe was appointed chief secretary of the Pyongyang City Committee of the Workers' Party of Korea in 2009, taking a post left unoccupied for nine years since his predecessor Kang Hyun-su's death in 2000. He left the post when he was elected Premier of North Korea on 7 June 2010 at the 3rd Session of the 12th Supreme People's Assembly.

Choe was elected member of the 5-members 6th Presidium of the Central Committee of the Workers' Party of Korea at the Party Conference held in September 2010. Choe's adoptive daughter Choe Son-hui is a vice minister in the Ministry of Foreign Affairs.

Premiership
Choe succeeded Kim Yong-il as premier during a second parliamentary session in 2010. It was speculated that Kim was ousted partly because of the failed currency reforms, which took place in early 2010. According to the South Korean newspaper Chosun Ilbo, he reportedly apologized publicly for the mishaps before stepping down. Kim's departure and Choe's elevation coincided with the dismissal of various other ministers in the cabinet who were ostensibly blamed for the failed reforms. The event was seen by analysts as achieving two purposes: settling public outcry over the currency valuation fiasco and engineering a political climate more favourable towards the succession of Kim Jong-un, the supreme leader's youngest son.

In February 2011, the North Korean media reported Choe's visit to a construction site. This was the first time the media had reported on a leadership figure other than the Supreme Leader conducting a solo guidance inspection. At the 7th Session of the 12th SPA on 1 April 2013, Choe was replaced as Premier of North Korea by Pak Pong-ju, as the assembly moved to the new strategy of building the economy and military simultaneously. Choe was given the title of honorary vice-president of the SPA Presidium, with Kim Yong-nam maintained as his supervisor in the President's role of the SPA.

Notes

References

|-

1930 births
Living people
People from Ryanggang
Prime Ministers of North Korea
North Korean expatriates in Russia
Moscow State University alumni
Members of the 6th Presidium of the Workers' Party of Korea
Members of the 6th Politburo of the Workers' Party of Korea
Alternate members of the 6th Politburo of the Workers' Party of Korea
Members of the 6th Central Committee of the Workers' Party of Korea